Kir-Tlyavli (Qır-Teläwle) is a rural locality (a selo) in Bazgiyevsky Selsoviet, Sharansky District, Bashkortostan, Russia. The population was 190 as of 2010. There is 1 street.

Geography 
Kir-Tlyavli is located 21 km southeast of Sharan (the district's administrative centre) by road. Starye Tlyavli is the nearest rural locality.

References 

Rural localities in Sharansky District